The 1958 Gael Linn Cup is a representative competition for elite level participants in the women's team field sport of camogie, was won by Leinster, who defeated Ulster in the final, played at Parnell Park.

Arrangements

The Final
Ulster defeated Munster, 4–1 to 2–6 and Leinster defeated Connacht, 6–7 to 0–2. Leinster defeated Ulster in the final at Parnell Park by 8–2 to 3–3. Agnes Hourigan wrote in the Irish Press: Leinsetr who fielded no less than ten Dublin players were in command from start to finish.

Final stages

|}

References

External links
 Camogie Association

1958 in camogie
1958
1958 in Northern Ireland sport